Eelke van Kleijn (born June 11, 1983) is a Dutch producer and DJ hailing from Rotterdam, The Netherlands. He is known mostly for his electronic dance music. Nowadays he currently produces music for other media, such as television series, commercials, movie trailers and animations.

Early life
In his early career (between 2003 and 2005), he mainly produced electronic records as MI.D.O.R. and Six4Eight, and he was responsible for some of the DJ Precision releases and remixes.

Career
Kleijn first release as Eelke Kleijn was "4.5 Billion Years" in 2003 on Segment Records. From 2005 onwards, he solely released music under his own name. His breakthrough came in 2006 when Nick Warren used the track "8 Bit Era" for his Global Underground: Paris compilation. As a result, Eelke released his first artist album Naturally Artificial on Global Underground in 2007. He remixed artists such as John Legend, Goldfish, Dave Seaman, Way Out West, Hybrid, Sander Kleinenberg and Nadia Ali. In 2010, Eelke released his second artist album Untold Stories through Manual Music.

As a DJ, Eelke has played in many venues and festivals including Mystery Land, Extrema Outdoor, Dance Valley, Sensation, Warung Brazil, Privilege Ibiza, Moonpark Buenos Aires, Balaton Sound, and several Ultra Music Festivals around the globe.

Since 2010, Eelke Kleijn as a producer is also involved in composing music for animations, games, and advertisements.

He is a BBC Radio 1 'Next Hype' act for 'Stand Up', remixing John Legend and Hollywood soundtracker for Parker, Wrath Of The Titans, This Means War, and Ron Howard's Rush trailers. 
Eelke has been performing and producing in the Before.Now.After collaboration with Dutch DJs/producers and friends Olivier Weiter, Miss Melera, and Arjuna Schiks in 2014 and 2015. Weiter and Kleijn are presenting the weekly Before.Now.After the radio show at Slam!FM with support of Miss Melera and Schiks as well.

Furthering his cinematic endeavors, Eelke Kleijn released his bootleg for The Hunger Games song "The Hanging Tree" by James Newton Howard featuring Jennifer Lawrence as main character. Having also built a new studio in 2016, Eelke spent much of his time creating new music leading up to the launch of his new imprint Days Like Nights.

Discography

Studio albums

Mix albums

Singles

Remixes

References

External links 

Eelke Kleijn on Resident Advisor
Interview with Eelke Kleijn on RomaInTheClub

Dutch DJs
1983 births
Living people
Musicians from Rotterdam
Spinnin' Records artists
Progressive house musicians
Electronic dance music DJs